Andrew James Janocko (born April 6, 1988) is an American football coach who is the quarterbacks coach for the Chicago Bears of the National Football League (NFL). He previously served as an assistant coach at Mercyhurst University, Tampa Bay Buccaneers and Rutgers University, before spending six years as an assistant coach with the Minnesota Vikings for various position groups; serving as their quarterbacks coach in his final year with the team.

Playing career
Janocko played college football at Pittsburgh from 2007 to 2010, primarily as a backup quarterback and special teams holder. Originally a walk-on, he earned a scholarship his junior season.

Coaching career

Early career
After graduating from Pitt in 2010 with a degree in history, Janocko was hired to be a graduate assistant on Greg Schiano's staff at Rutgers. He joined Schiano when he was named head coach of the Tampa Bay Buccaneers in 2012, as an offensive assistant. He spent the 2014 season as a quarterbacks coach at Mercyhurst in Erie, Pennsylvania.

Minnesota Vikings
In 2015, Janocko was hired by the Minnesota Vikings as an offensive quality control coach under head coach Mike Zimmer, working in that role before shifting to an assistant offensive line coach under Tony Sparano in 2017.

Janocko was named a co-offensive line coach along Clancy Barone for the 2018 season, after the sudden death of Sparano. He was shifted back to the assistant offensive line coach in 2019 following the hire of Rick Dennison.

On January 27, 2020, Janocko was promoted to wide receivers coach.

On February 9, 2021, Janocko was promoted to quarterbacks coach, replacing Klint Kubiak, who was promoted to offensive coordinator.

Chicago Bears
On February 3, 2022, Janocko was hired by the Chicago Bears as their new quarterbacks coach.

Personal life
Janocko's father Tim was a fullback at Penn State and has been the head coach at Clearfield Area High School since the 1980s.  Janocko and his wife Natalie currently live in Chicago.

References

External links
 Minnesota Vikings profile

1988 births
Living people
People from Clearfield, Pennsylvania
American football quarterbacks
Players of American football from Pennsylvania
Pittsburgh Panthers football players
Rutgers Scarlet Knights football coaches
Tampa Bay Buccaneers coaches
Mercyhurst Lakers football coaches
Minnesota Vikings coaches
Chicago Bears coaches